The Gram Panchayat of Sattari or Sattari Gram Panchayat also known as Binodpur Gram Panchayat (abbreviated as BGP), is a government office and local self-government body that governs the village of Sattari and 8 nearby villages with 13 G.P constituencies or three Panchayat Samity constituencies in English Bazar Block of District Malda in the state of West Bengal, India. It has control of The English Bazar police station serves this panchayat, with its headquarters at Sattari village.

Geography
Binodpur Gram Panchayat is located at  Sattari village of English Bazar Block in Malda district.

History
The Binodpur Gram Panchayat was panchayati raj power held by Government of West Bengal since 1977 under Panchayati raj (India). This panchayat is administrated by English Bazar Block.

On 27 July 2012 the office was vandalized by angry villagers who were demanding road repairs. While pradhan of the district allowed the meeting to begin, he himself wasn't present and therefore angered the community.

Pradhans

Electoral divisions
Gram Panchayat seats at Binodpur Gram Panchayat

Panchayat Samiti seats at Binodpur Gram Panchayat

Members of Gram Panchayat
Member of Binodpur Gram Panchayat 2018

Member of Binodpur Gram Panchayat 2013-2018

Members of Panchayat Samity
Members of Panchayat Samity at Binodpur Gram Panchayat 2018

Members of Panchayat Samity at Binodpur Gram Panchayat 2013

Villages
It covers 9 villages, with their names and parts as follows.

See also
Sattari
Milki

References

External links
Somelines About Us

Gram panchayats in West Bengal